Lindsay Davenport defeated the defending champion Martina Hingis in the final, 6–3, 7–5 to win the women's singles tennis title at the 1998 US Open. The final was a rematch of the previous year's semifinal. Davenport did not drop a set during the tournament.

This was the final US Open main draw appearance for five-time champion Steffi Graf; she lost to Patty Schnyder in the fourth round. It was also the first US Open appearance for future world No. 1 and six-time champion Serena Williams; she was defeated by Irina Spîrlea in the third round.

Seeds

Qualifying

Draw

Finals

Top half

Section 1

Section 2

Section 3

Section 4

Bottom half

Section 5

Section 6

Section 7

Section 8

External links
1998 US Open – Women's draws and results at the International Tennis Federation

Women's Singles
US Open (tennis) by year – Women's singles
1998 in women's tennis
1998 in American women's sports